Pierre-Paul Le Mercier de La Rivière (10 March 1719 – 27 November 1801) was a French colonial administrator and physiocrat economist. Mercier was a councilor at the Parliament of Paris, intendant at Martinique in the West Indies (1759-1764), and noted advocate of Physiocracy. In 1774, Mercier wrote a letter to Benjamin Franklin proposing to purchase 5,000 tons of Philadelphia flour.

He was born at Saumur, (Maine-et-Loire) and died in 1801 in Grigny, Essonne

References

1719 births
1801 deaths
French colonial governors and administrators
People from Saumur
Ancien Régime office-holders
Physiocrats
18th-century French  economists